Alicia Previn (also known as Lovely Previn) is an American violinist, songwriter, recording artist and author. She is most associated as the daughter of André Previn KBE, the conductor of the Houston, Pittsburgh, and London Symphony Orchestras and the Royal Philharmonic Orchestra, and American jazz singer Betty Bennett.

Early years
Previn began playing the violin at 7-years-old and was classically trained at the Royal Academy of Music in London by Virginia Majewski and Joan Rotchford-Davies. She experimented with other music genres such as rock, folk, blues and jazz, performing in bands from age thirteen. In high school, she joined the London Symphony Orchestra Chorus, conducted by her father at the Royal Albert and Festival Halls.

Career
Previn recorded, performed and toured with a variety of bands and artists in diverse musical genres, playing across the globe on singles and CDs. She was also a member of the Irish rock group In Tua Nua as well as The Young Dubliners. She appeared on television in the U.S. and internationally in music TV shows, commercials, videos and MTV music videos. She also performed on Jay Leno's Tonight Show in 1993 with "The Cages" with British talk-show host Des O'Connor. Previn was nominated at the San Diego Music Awards in 2013 as best female musician with now disbanded group "Folding Mr. Lincoln".

Her recording career includes Polydor Records' artist, Philip D'Arrow, Atlantic Records' artist Andy Leek, London Records' artists The Hothouse Flowers, Virgin Records' band In Tua Nua, Dave King's band Flogging Molly (formerly Fastway) and Katmandu, Irish rock band Finn MacCool, New Red Archives Records' Ten Bright Spikes, Red Planet Records' The Bumpin' Uglies, Virgin Records' Cracker with David Lowery, JVC Records' Great White and Jack Russell, Capitol Records' Richard Thompson, and with Barry McGuire and Terry Talbot, as well as English bands such as General Public, The Communards, Barry Blue/Julian Littman Productions, and The Flying Pickets. She also leads her own band in the UK and released "Shatterproof" in 1982.

In August 2017 Previn was the subject of a cover story in the California-based publication, The San Diego Troubadour.

Author
Previn has authored children's books addressing the ecological future regarding earthworms, tortoises  bees. The Earthworm Book includes instructions on how to start a small worm farm. Previn is also involved in the Bio-Dynamic Farming method. In "Give Bees a Chance" Previn deliberately put a picture of a bee on the top corner of every page. “That means the child has to touch it every time they turn the page." It is meant to help them lose their fear of being stung.

Personal life
Previn lives in Encinitas, California, teaches private violin lessons, records, and plays professionally with her own band.

Discography

Solo
Albums
 1982  Lovely Previn - Shatterproof  (U.K.)
 2018  Alicia Previn - Lovely (U.S.) 

Singles
 1982 Lovely Previn - I'll Never Get Over You / Cheat (7" released in U.K.,Scandinavia and Germany)
 1982 Lovely Previn - Wasted Love / Down On The Farm (12" & 7" U.K. only)
 1981 Lovely Previn - From A to B / Tower of Strength (7" released in U.K. and Germany)
 2023 Alicia Previn - Purpose of a Dog / le Brusc (CD & Digitial)

Compilations
 2000 Various Artists - Class X Volume 10 - U.S. release, includes Lovely Previn I'll Never Get Over You 
 1982 Various Artists - Wave News The New Generation of Music - German release, includes Lovely Previn From A to B Wasted Love

As a band member
 2017 Hedersleben - Orbit
 2013 Folding Mr. Lincoln - Two Rivers
 2006 The Chuck Butler Band - On Fire 
 2002 Terry Talbot - Steps of the Mission
 1995 The Young Dubliners - Breathe (reissued 1999) 
 1993 The Young Dubliners - Rocky Road (reissued 1998)
 1988 In Tua Nua - The Long Acre (released in U.K., Japan, U.S., Europe, Canada, Italy - reissued in Italy with bonus tracks 2009)

Selected session work

Albums
 2022 Ken Lehnig - Between Us
 2017 Laurie Beebe Lewis - Baby Birds
 2016 Bob Monroe & The Vintage Cowboys - Classic Country (unreleased)
 2013 Yael & Vlady - Delicious in Ze Middle
 2010 Andy Leek - Midnight Music (originally recorded in 1982 as “Deceit”, but unreleased at the time)
 2006 Hothouse Flowers - The Platinum Collection (#45 Ireland)
 2002 Ric Blair Band - Break the Walls
 2001 Richard Thompson - Action Packed: The Best Of The Capitol Years
 2000 Hothouse Flowers - Best Of (#35 Ireland)
 1999 Richard Thompson - Mock Tudor (#28 U.K.)
 1996 Jack Russell - Shelter Me 
 1996 Great White - Let it Rock
 1995 Ric Blair – Always By My Side 
 1994 Gerry Groom – Twice Blue
 1994 Ten Bright Spikes - Crime Map (unreleased)
 1993 Ten Bright Spikes - Astro Stukas
 1993 Ten Bright Spikes - Blueland
 1993 Gerry Groom Featuring Mick Taylor And Friends – Once In A Blue Moon
 1992 Cracker -  s/t  (1st album) 
 1987 Hothouse Flowers - People  (#1 Ireland, #2 U.K., #30 Australia, #88 U.S.)
 1984 The Communards - s/t (#7 U.K., #15 Germany, #90 U.S.)
 1984 General Public - All the Rage (#26 U.S., #19 Canada)

Singles
 1987 Hothouse Flowers – Easier In The Morning (#6 Ireland, #77 U.K., #98 Australia)
 1984 Communards  – You Are My World (#30 U.K.)
 1984 Andde Leek  – Dancing Queen (U.K. release)
 1984 Andde Leek  – Soul Darling (U.K. release)

Soundtracks
 2017 Diamond Cartel (with Hedersleben – "Rarefied Air")
 2019 Ruta Madre (with Joey Molina - "Little Hippie" featuring Alicia Previn)

References

Living people
Musicians from Los Angeles
American people of German-Jewish descent
American people of Polish-Jewish descent
American women children's writers
American children's writers
Place of birth missing (living people)
Year of birth missing (living people)
Alumni of the Royal Academy of Music
Songwriters from California
21st-century American violinists
21st-century American women musicians
Previn family